Club Social y Deportivo Prat is a football team in the city of Punta Arenas, Chile. It was founded on January 19, 1931 and plays in the Asociación Punta Arenas of ANFA.

History 

The club was founded on January 19, 1931 in Punta Arenas, Chile.

In 2009 the team was crowned champion of the Campeonato Regional de Clubes de la ANFA in the Magallanes Region, defeating Sokol, earning them a spot to play the Copa Chile this season.

In the first phase the Copa defeated Lord Cochrane. In the second round it was eliminated by Provincial Osorno after losing 2:1 at home.

In 2010 the team won a championship qualifier against Sokol, Cosal and Bories, earning them a spot to play the Copa Chile Bicentenario. In this tournament they lost the matches with Puerto Montt for 10:0 in the aggregate.

Copa Chile

Players

First-team squad

Personnel

Current technical staff

Managers 
  Mario Alvarez (2005 - 2006)
  Guillermo Faúndez (2006 - 2009)
  Miguel Lara (2009 - 2022)
  Cristián Hernández (2022 - present)

Honours 

Campeonato Regional Magallanes: 8
(1991, 2002, 2003, 2006, 2007, 2009, 2010, 2015)

External links 
http://www.radiopolar.cl/noticia_27992.html
http://www.radiopolar.com/noticia_35942.html
http://www.radiopolar.com/noticia_28159.html

Football clubs in Chile
Punta Arenas
1931 establishments in Chile